The UK Borders Act 2007 is an Act of the Parliament of the United Kingdom about immigration and asylum. Amongst other things, it introduced compulsory biometric residence permits for non-EU immigrants and introduced greater powers for immigration control. It received Royal Assent on 30 October 2007 with sections 17 and 59 to 61 coming into force on that day.

The first commencement order made under section 59 of the Act brought sections 1-4, 5-8, 14, 15, 18, 20, 22, 23, 29-31 and 40-43 fully into force on 31 January 2008. The same commencement order brought sections 10, 11, 13, 16 and 26 either partially into force, or into force subject to transitional provisions, on the same day. Repeals relating to the Immigration Act 1971, Immigration and Asylum Act 1999, Commissioners for Revenue and Customs Act 2005, Immigration, Asylum and Nationality Act 2006 and section 130 of the Nationality, Immigration and Asylum Act 2002 were also commenced on 31 January.

Among other provisions, the Act provides immigration officers with several police-like powers, such as detention, entry, search and seizure. It also created The Independent Chief Inspector of the UK Border Agency.

References

External links

United Kingdom Acts of Parliament 2007
Immigration law in the United Kingdom
Borders of the United Kingdom
Right of asylum legislation in the United Kingdom